James Albert Varney Jr. (June 15, 1949 – February 10, 2000) was an American actor and comedian. He is best known for his broadly comedic role as Ernest P. Worrell, for which he won a Daytime Emmy Award, as well as appearing in films and numerous television commercial advertising campaigns. He played Jed Clampett in a film adaptation of The Beverly Hillbillies (1993) and performed the voice of Slinky Dog in the first two films of the Toy Story franchise (1995–1999). He died at age 50 of lung cancer on February 10, 2000, leaving two posthumous releases, Daddy and Them and Atlantis: The Lost Empire.

Early life
Varney was born in Lexington, Kentucky. As a child, he displayed the ability to memorize long poems and significant portions of the material from books, which he used to entertain family and friends. When Varney was a boy, his mother would turn on cartoons for him to watch. His mother discovered that Varney quickly began to imitate the cartoon characters, so she started him in children's theater when he was eight years old. Varney began his interest in theater as a teenager, winning state titles in drama competitions while a student at Lafayette High School (class of 1968) in Lexington.

At the age of 15, he portrayed Ebenezer Scrooge in a local theater production; by 17, he was performing professionally in nightclubs and coffee houses. Varney studied Shakespeare at the Barter Theatre in Abingdon, Virginia, and performed in an Opryland folk show in its first year of operation, in the 1970s. He listed a former teacher, Thelma Beeler, as being a mentor in his becoming an actor. When he was 24, Varney was an actor at the Pioneer Playhouse in Danville, Kentucky. The theater was adjacent to an Old West-themed village, and before the show, the audience would tour the village where apprentices would play townsfolk. Varney and the company usually played in the outdoor theater to audiences of only a few dozen people. He entertained the young apprentices by throwing knives into trees. He performed in Blithe Spirit, Boeing 707 and an original musical, Fire on the Mountain. He once jokingly threatened a long-haired apprentice, John Lino Ponzini, that he would take him up to Hazard, Kentucky, where "you [Ponzini] wouldn't make it down Main Street without the townsfolk giving you a crewcut".

Career

Early career
Varney had an established acting career before his fame as Ernest. In 1976, Varney was a regular cast member of the television show Johnny Cash and Friends. He also played a recurring guest on the faux late-night talk show Fernwood 2 Night. From 1977 to 1979, Varney was cast as Seaman "Doom & Gloom" Broom in the television version of Operation Petticoat. Just prior to his stint as Ernest, he was a cast member on the notorious television flop Pink Lady and Jeff. In 1978, Varney played Milo Skinner on the TV show Alice.

Work for Carden and Cherry
Varney's best-known character is Ernest P. Worrell, who would address the camera as if speaking to a friend, using his trademarked catchphrase "KnoWhutImean, Vern?" In 1980, the first commercial featuring the character advertised an appearance by the Dallas Cowboys Cheerleaders at Beech Bend Park, an amusement park located near Bowling Green, Kentucky. The character was franchised for use in markets all over the country and was often used by dairies to advertise milk products. For example, the dairy bar and hamburger chain Braum's ran several advertisements featuring Ernest; Purity Dairies, based in Nashville, Pine State Dairy in Raleigh, North Carolina, and Oakhurst Dairy in Maine ran commercials that were nearly identical, but with the dairy name changed.

For the same agency, Varney created a different character, Sgt. Glory, a humorless drill instructor who harangued cows of the client dairy into producing better milk. In another spot, Sgt. Glory's home was shown as he had a date, which was so heavily decorated with the products of the sponsor and advertising specialty items that it was essentially devoid of any other decor. The Sgt. Glory character also appeared in an advertisement for a Southern grocery chain, Pruett's Food Town, in which he drilled the checkout clerks on proper behavior: "Bread on top. Repeat: Bread on top." He approaches one of them at the end of the commercial with a look of menace and says, "You're not smilin'." The checkout bagger gives a very nervous and forced smile.

Varney also starred as Ernest in a series of commercials that ran in the New Orleans area (and throughout the Gulf South) as a spokesman for natural gas utilities. In one, he is seen kneeling down in front of Vern's desk under a lamp hanging from the ceiling, stating, "Natural gas, Vern; it's hot, fast, and cheap. Hot, fast, cheap; kinda like your first wife, Vern, you know, the pretty one!?" Vern then knocks the lamp into Ernest's head, knocking him down. Those same television advertisements also were featured on channels in the St. Louis area for Laclede Gas Company during the mid-1980s and in the metro Detroit area for Michigan Consolidated Gas Company. Another TV ad for Laclede Gas featured Ernest saying, "Heat pump, schmeat pump."

Varney also appeared in several Braum's Ice Cream and Dairy Stores commercials throughout the 1980s. These aired on Oklahoma television. He made commercials for car dealerships across the country, most notably Cerritos Auto Square in Cerritos, California, Tysons Toyota in Tysons Corner, Virginia, and Audubon Chrysler in Henderson, Kentucky.

Varney portrayed Ernest in a series of commercials for Convenient Food Mart during the 1980s. In 1982, Varney co-hosted the syndicated Pop! Goes the Country with singer Tom T. Hall. The show had just had a major overhaul and ended shortly afterward. He also portrayed "Auntie Nelda" in numerous commercials; dressed in drag and appearing to be a senior citizen, the commercials gave off the tone of "Auntie Nelda" as a motherly lady encouraging one to do what was right (in this case, buy whatever product was being promoted). This character, along with the "Ernest" character, ran for a few years in Mississippi and Louisiana in commercials for Leadco Aluminum Siding, before it became a regular in the Ernest movies. Varney also appeared as Ernest in on-air promos for local TV stations in several markets, talking about their news and weather personalities.

During the 1990s, Varney reprised his role as Ernest for Blake's Lotaburger, a fast-food chain in New Mexico. In these commercials, Ernest typically would be trying to get into Vern's house to see what food Vern was eating. After a lengthy description of whatever tasty morsel Vern had, Ernest would get locked out but would continue to shout from outside.

Ernest's popularity

The character of Ernest became widely popular, and was the basis for a short-lived TV series, Hey Vern, It's Ernest! (1988) and a series of movies in the 1980s and 1990s.

Ernest Goes to Camp (1987) grossed $23.5 million at the U.S. box office, on a $3.5 million production budget, and stayed in the box-office top five for its first three weeks of release. Though Varney was nominated for the Razzie Award for Worst New Star, only one year later, he earned the Daytime Emmy Award for Outstanding Performer in a Children's Series for Hey Vern, It's Ernest! Subsequent theatrically released Ernest films include Ernest Saves Christmas (1988), Ernest Goes to Jail (1990), Ernest Scared Stupid (1991), and Ernest Rides Again (1993). After the financial failure of Ernest Rides Again, all further films were released direct-to-video: Ernest Goes to School (1994) which had a brief theatrical run in Ohio, Slam Dunk Ernest (1995), Ernest Goes to Africa (1997), and Ernest in the Army (1998).

The Walt Disney World Resort's Epcot theme park featured Ernest. Epcot's Cranium Command attraction used the Ernest character in its preshow as an example of a "lovable, but not the brightest person on the planet" type of person. In addition to his Ernest Goes to... series, he starred as Ernest in several smaller movies for John R. Cherry III, such as Knowhutimean? Hey Vern, It's My Family Album; Dr. Otto and the Riddle of the Gloom Beam; and the direct-to-video feature Your World as I See It, all of which showcased him in a wide variety of characters and accents.

The Ernest Film Festival (Greatest Hits Volume 1) was released on VHS in 1986. Greatest Hits Volume 2 was released in 1992. Mill Creek Entertainment released these classic television commercials on DVD box sets October 31, 2006. Image Entertainment re-released them on June 5, 2012, as part of the DVD set Ernest's Wacky Adventures: Volume 1.

Other roles

From 1983 to 1984, Varney played heartthrob Chad Everett's younger brother Evan Earp in the comedy-drama, high-action television series The Rousters, created by Stephen J. Cannell, about the descendants of Wyatt Earp, a family of bounty hunters/carnival bouncers. As Evan Earp, Varney played a con man/mechanical-inventor "genius," constantly getting himself into comedic trouble, with those around him ready to lynch him. Although the series was promising, the show failed after its first season because it was poorly slotted (four episodes every few months) against the number-one prime-time television series for the previous six years, The Love Boat.

Varney can be seen in Hank Williams Jr.'s video for "All My Rowdy Friends Are Coming Over Tonight", in which he is briefly shown casually riding a bull being pulled on a rope by a young lady, and later in a swimming pool with two young ladies.

In 1985, Varney co-hosted HBO's New Year's Eve special, along with Johnny Cash and Kris Kristofferson. Varney also starred as Jed Clampett in the 1993 production of The Beverly Hillbillies; played Rex, a carnival worker/associate of Dennis Quaid in Wilder Napalm; and played the accident-prone entertainer/watch guard ("safety guy/human torch") Rudy James in the movie Snowboard Academy. He later played a small role in the 1995 action film The Expert as a weapons dealer named Snake.

Varney also lent his voice to Slinky Dog in Disney/Pixar's Toy Story and reprised the role in Toy Story 2 in the Toy Story series (he was replaced by his close friend Blake Clark in Toy Story 3 and Toy Story 4 after his death in 2000). Varney played numerous other characters, including "Cookie" Farnsworth, from Atlantis: The Lost Empire, released the year after his death (Steven Barr replaced Varney for the sequel Atlantis: Milo's Return), the carny character Cooder in the "Bart Carny" episode of The Simpsons, the character Walt Evergreen in the Duckman episode "You've Come a Wrong Way, Baby", Prince Carlos Charmaine (a royal suitor Jackie dates) for a few episodes of the final season of the 1990s television series Roseanne, and Lothar Zogg in the 1998 film 3 Ninjas: High Noon at Mega Mountain, also starring Hulk Hogan and Loni Anderson.

Varney had a brief role as an incestuous, abusive father in an independent film, 100 Proof, for which he received good reviews from critics. He also played a rebel in the midnight movie Existo, as well as an old mariner in a low-budget horror film, Blood, Friends, and Money. During the filming of Treehouse Hostage, he played an escaped convict held hostage and tormented by some fifth graders in a treehouse.

One of Varney's final films was Billy Bob Thornton's Daddy and Them, in which he played Uncle Hazel, who had been arrested for murder. Co-stars included Kelly Preston and Andy Griffith. Another final guest appearance was the Bibleman Genesis series Bibleman Jr. Volume 1 & 2 as himself. Varney starred in three videos, The Misadventures of Bubba, The Misadventures of Bubba II, and Bubba Goes Hunting, in which he played himself and taught young kids important safety rules about hunting and guns. He illustrated the rules with the help of his bumbling and accident-prone cousin Bubba (also played by Varney) and Bubba's nephew, Billy Bob. The videos were distributed as part of a membership pack from Buckmasters' Young Bucks Club.

According to an interview, one of his final projects was writing a screenplay about the legendary feud between the Hatfields and the McCoys, stating that his grandfather hunted squirrel with the Hatfields. Varney also allegedly had been hoping to acquire more serious acting roles before his death, wanting to step outside the typecast of Ernest.

Personal life
Varney was married twice, first to Jacqueline Drew (1977–1983) and then to Jane Varney (1988–1991). Both marriages ended in divorce, although he remained friends with his ex-wife Jane until his death; she became Varney's spokeswoman and accompanied him in Pixar's 1999 film Toy Story 2. Neither union resulted in children.

On December 6, 2013, Varney's nephew Justin Lloyd published a comprehensive biography about his uncle titled The Importance of Being Ernest: The Life of Actor Jim Varney (Stuff that Vern doesn't even know). The same year, director Cherry released a Varney biography called Keeper of the Clown.

, director David Pagano and Ernest Goes to Camp cast member Daniel Butler are planning to release a documentary about Varney called  The Importance of Being Ernest. 

Varney was an accomplished mountain dulcimer player and once played the instrument on the very last episode of The Chevy Chase Show.

Illness and death
Varney was a long-time chain smoker. During the filming of Treehouse Hostage in August 1998, he developed a cough. At first, he presumed it was a cold caused by cold weather in the filming location. However, as it became worse, Varney began noticing blood on his handkerchief. When filming was complete, he sought medical treatment and was diagnosed with lung cancer.

Though his condition slowly worsened, Varney reportedly threw his cigarettes away and quit smoking to continue performing. He eventually returned to Tennessee, where he underwent chemotherapy. However, it failed and he subsequently died on Thursday, February 10, 2000, at his home in White House, Tennessee, a city north of Nashville, at the age of 50. He was buried in Lexington Cemetery in Lexington, Kentucky.

Disney's Atlantis: The Lost Empire, which was released a year later, was his last dubbing work, and was dedicated to his memory.

Filmography

Film

Television

Video games

References

External links 

 
 
 
 

1949 births
2000 deaths
20th-century American comedians
20th-century American male actors
Actors from Lexington, Kentucky
American male comedians
American male film actors
American male television actors
American male video game actors
American male voice actors
American sketch comedians
American stand-up comedians
Audiobook narrators
Burials in Kentucky
Deaths from lung cancer in Tennessee
Male actors from Kentucky
People from White House, Tennessee